The pygmy rock mouse (Petromyscus collinus) is a species of rodent in the family Nesomyidae.
It is found in Angola, Namibia, and South Africa.
Its natural habitat is subtropical or tropical dry shrubland.

References
 Coetzee, N. & Schlitter, D. 2004.  Petromyscus collinus.   2006 IUCN Red List of Threatened Species.   Downloaded on 19 July 2007.

Petromyscus
Mammals described in 1925
Taxa named by Oldfield Thomas
Taxa named by Martin Hinton
Taxonomy articles created by Polbot